The 1980–81 season of the Moroccan Throne Cup was the 25th edition of the competition.

Wydad Athletic Club won the cup, beating CODM Meknès 2–1 in the final, played at the Prince Moulay Abdellah Stadium in Rabat. Wydad Athletic Club won the title for the fourth time in their history.

Tournament

Last 16

Quarter-finals

Semi-finals

Final 
The final was played between the two winning semi-finalists, Wydad Athletic Club and CODM Meknès, on 16 September 1980 at the Prince Moulay Abdellah Stadium in Rabat.

Notes and references 

1980
1980 in association football
1981 in association football
1980–81 in Moroccan football